Emmett McLoughlin (born John Patrick McLoughlin; February 3, 1907 – October 9, 1970) was a former Catholic priest of the Franciscan order who became known in the 1930s as an advocate for low-income housing in Phoenix, Arizona. He left the priesthood in 1948 in order to remain superintendent of St Monica's (later Phoenix Memorial) Hospital and wrote a number of books, including his autobiography People's Padre. Time magazine called him "America's best-known ex-priest".

Life 
 
McLoughlin grew up in Sacramento, California, and entered St. Anthony's Seminary in Santa Barbara, California. He took the name Emmett during his novitiate in the Franciscan order.

After his ordination in 1933 he was assigned to South Phoenix, a segregated area in Phoenix, Arizona, and began work there that would last for 14 years. He founded St Monica's Catholic Church for African-American and Hispanic residents in the neighborhood, and became known for his activism via the attached community center and medical clinic. Together they came to be known as the "Father Emmett Mission". He pushed for the Matthew Henson public housing projects (opened in 1940) and became chairman of the Phoenix Housing Authority. Time magazine said that "soon young Father McLoughlin began to be almost as well known in Phoenix as the mayor."
 
The clinic developed into St. Monica's Hospital in 1944, eventually becoming Phoenix Memorial Hospital. In People's Padre, McLoughlin says that some priests in the area objected to the clinic treating venereal disease. McLoughlin also encouraged workers to smuggle scorpion antivenom from Mexico.

McLoughlin's Franciscan superiors charged him with neglect of his priestly duties and ordered him to resign as superintendent of the hospital. McLoughlin decided that his work for the hospital and urban renewal was more important than his vow of obedience, and resigned as a member of the Catholic priesthood on December 1, 1948 to remain head of the hospital. He had the support of its board of directors, many of whom were Catholic.

In August 1949 he married Mary Davis. He met her when she came to work at Phoenix Memorial Hospital working in the Medical Records Department. He noted in his 1954 book People's Padre that he did not lose faith in God after leaving the priesthood, but found he read more of the Bible and religious periodicals.

He has been criticized in Catholic circles for not following the vow of obedience to the Church that he had taken as a Franciscan. McLoughlin criticized the Church for requiring young men to take such a vow, often without having experience of life outside school and seminary. He also criticized the Catholic parochial school system, and alleged that a Catholic plot had existed to assassinate Abraham Lincoln, criticisms which fed anti-Catholicism in America in the 1950s and 1960s.

He also joined Freemasonry.

In early 1970, Mcloughlin was still administrator of Phoenix Memorial. He later moved to Oklahoma, where he died on October 9, 1970. He is buried in Berwyn Cemetery in Gene Autry.

Legacy 
The city of Phoenix named the Emmett McLoughlin Community Training & Education Center in his honor.

Works 

 People's Padre: an Autobiography (Boston : Beacon Press, 1954).
 American Culture and Catholic Schools (New York: Lyle Stuart, Inc., 1960).
 Crime and Immorality in the Catholic Church (New York: Lyle Stuart, Inc., 1962).
 An Inquiry in the Assassination of Abraham Lincoln (New York: Lyle Stuart, Inc., 1963).
 Letters to an ex-priest (New York: Lyle Stuart, Inc., 1965).
 Famous Ex-Priests (New York: Lyle Stuart, Inc., 1968).

References 

20th-century American Roman Catholic priests
1907 births
1970 deaths
Critics of the Catholic Church
American conspiracy theorists
American hospital administrators